Blainville-sur-Orne (literally Blainville on Orne) is a commune in the Calvados department in the Normandy region in northwestern France.

Geography
Blainville-sur-Orne is on the west side of the Canal de Caen à la Mer, just south of Bénouville and the famous Pegasus Bridge of D-Day fame. The town is also home to a Renault Trucks (formerly Saviem) manufacturing plant. The plant is across the canal to the southeast, between the canal and the Orne River. Just across the river from the plant is the commune of Colombelles. Directly across the canal from Blainville-sur-Orne is the fourth commercial French port for the importation of exotic wood, generally coming from the Gulf of Guinea. The port also exports cereals that are produced in the area and has a silo capacity of 33,000 tons.

Population

Twin towns
Blainville-sur-Orne is twinned with:

  Bomlitz, Germany, since 2004
  Sartirana Lomellina, Italy, since 2007

See also
Blainville, Quebec - a suburb of Montreal
Communes of the Calvados department

References

Communes of Calvados (department)
Calvados communes articles needing translation from French Wikipedia